Alfred Burton Greenwood (July 11, 1811 – October 4, 1889) was an American attorney and a politician; he was elected to the United States and Confederate congresses as a Democrat.  In 1859 he was appointed under President James Buchanan as Commissioner of Indian Affairs, and resigned when Arkansas seceded from the Union in 1861.

Early life and education
Alfred Burton Greenwood was born to Elizabeth (née Ingram) Hugh B. Greenwood in Franklin County, Georgia on July 11, 1811. He was educated in Lawrenceville, Georgia. He graduated from the University of Georgia in Athens, Georgia. He was admitted to the bar in 1832 and relocated to Decatur, Georgia He owned slaves.

Career
In 1837, he was appointed as a quartermaster as part of the Cherokee removal. In December 1838, after seeing what Arkansas had to offer, he resigned his commission. He moved his family to Bentonville, Arkansas and became the small town's first attorney. He went into politics and was elected to two terms in the Arkansas legislature; serving from 1842 to 1845. He served as Arkansas's prosecuting attorney from 1845 to 1851 and the Fourth Judicial Circuit Arkansas from 1851 to 1853.

He was elected as a Democrat to the United States House of Representatives from Arkansas, and served from March 4, 1853, to March 3, 1859. He was appointed in 1858 as Commissioner of Indian Affairs by President James Buchanan. He served in that role from May 13, 1859, to April 13, 1861. He was offered the role of U.S. Secretary of the Interior after Jacob Thompson resigned, but declined the position.

With the outbreak of the Civil War in 1861, Greenwood was elected to the  Congress of the Confederate States from Arkansas and served from 1862 to 1865. In 1864 he was appointed tax collector for Arkansas.

In 1873, Greenwood moved to Cassville, Missouri where he practiced law. He was elected as a judge and served in that role until he returned to Arkansas in June 1879.

Personal life
Greenwood married Sarah A. Hilburn (1819–1884) of Union, South Carolina in 1833. Together, they had 12 children.

Death
Greenwood died on October 4, 1889, in Bentonville. He was interred at Bentonville Cemetery.

Legacy
Both Greenwood, Arkansas, and Greenwood County, Kansas, are named after him.

References

Greenwood County Historical Society (Greenwood County, Kan.) (1986). The History of Greenwood County, Kansas (Vol 1), p. 25. Josten's Publications, Wichita, Kan.

1811 births
1889 deaths
People from Franklin County, Georgia
Democratic Party members of the United States House of Representatives from Arkansas
Members of the Confederate House of Representatives from Arkansas
Georgia (U.S. state) lawyers
Arkansas lawyers
American slave owners
People from Bentonville, Arkansas
19th-century American politicians
University of Georgia alumni